The Anishinaabe, like most Algonquian-speaking groups in North America, base their system of kinship on clans or totems.  The Ojibwe word for clan was borrowed into English as totem.  The clans, based mainly on animals, were instrumental in traditional occupations, intertribal relations, and marriages.  Today, the clan remains an important part of Anishinaabe identity.

Tradition 
In Anishinaabemowin,  means heart.  or clan literally would translate as 'the expression of, or having to do with one's heart'; in other words  refers to the extended family.

The meh established "a framework of government to give them strength and order" in which each totem represents a core branch of knowledge and responsibility essential to society. Today, six general totems compose this framework. The crane and the loon are the chiefs, responsible for over-seeing and leading the people. The fish are the scholars and thinkers and are responsible for solving disputes between the crane and the loon. The bear are both warriors and medicine gatherers. The martens are hunters but also warriors as well. The moose are craftsman and artists. Clans are both a means of acquiring and retaining knowledge for the Anishinaabe. Knowledge gained through experience and interactions with the Spirits and other clan members is passed down and built upon through generations.

In meeting others, the traditional greeting among the Ojibwe peoples is "What is your ?" ("") in order to establish a social conduct between the two meeting parties as family. Marriage among members of the same clan is forbidden.

Etymology 
The word  is a dependent noun.

Pedagogy 
The clan system is an integral part of acquiring and retaining knowledge for the Anishinaabe. Each clan contributes a key element to the society and individual members contribute to a clan’s knowledge through experience. During a clan member’s lifetime, they are able to gain knowledge known by the clan; emphasis is placed on personal experience, rather than a strict student-teacher relationship. Although members learn through relationships with other clan members, it is the experience gained as a result of these relationships that allows them to attain knowledge. Throughout a clan member’s life, knowledge they gain that was previously unknown to the clan is added to the clan’s collective knowledge.

Despite pressure from the colonial society in Canada and the United States, much Anishinaabe knowledge has survived and continues to be shared and built upon. Alexander Wolfe's Earth Elder 18 Stories: The Pinayzitt Path, Dr. Dan Musqua's The Seven Fires: Teachings of the Bear Clan, and Edward Benton-Banai's The Mishomis Book: The Voice of the Ojibway are a few notable works of Anishinaabe literature. These publications are important carriers of knowledge that pass from the ancestors to future generations.

Clan totems 
There were at least twenty-one Ojibwe totems in all, recorded by William Whipple Warren. Other recorders, such as John Tanner, list many fewer but with different  types. For the Potawatomi, at least 15 different totems were recorded. Like any other Algonquian groups, the Anishinaabe clan system served as a system of government as well as a means of dividing labour. The five groups or phratries are listed below, listing each of the  clans or gentes within their group. The known Algonquin clans are marked with (Al), Mississauga clans with (Ms), Nipissing clans with (Ns), Ojibwa clans with (Oj), Odawa clans with (Od) and Potawatomi clans with (Po).

Bimaawidaasi group
The Bimaawidaasi group was charged with scouting, hunting and gathering.
 "Hooves" subdivision:
 Moozwaanowe ("Little" Moose-tail) (Oj)
 Moozens or Moozoons or Moozonii (Little Moose)
 Mooz (Moose) (Od, Oj)
 Adik (Caribou) (Al, Ms, Oj, Od) — The Adik totem is common among the Ojibwa and Oji-Cree north of Lake Superior.  A prominent family from this doodem from the Grand Portage area relocated to La Pointe and produced the chiefs Mamongazeda and Waubojeeg.  Later members of this branch became leaders at Sault Ste. Marie.
 Waawaashkeshi (Deer) (Al, Ms)
 Mishewe (Elk) (Oj, Po)
 Omashkooz (Stag)
 Eshkan (Antler)
 Bizhiki (Buffalo) (Ms)
 "Little Paws" subdivision:
 Waabizheshi (Marten) (Oj)
 Amik(waa) (Beaver) (Ms, Ns, Oj, Od, Po)
 Wazhashk (Muskrat) (Oj)
 Gaag (Porcupine)
 Esiban (Raccoon)
 Waabooz(oo) (Rabbit) (Oj, Po)
 Zhaangweshi (Mink)
 Waagoshiinh (Fox) (Po)
 Zhigaag (Skunk) (Ms)
 Asanagoo (Squirrel) (Ns, Od)

Giishkizhigwan group
The Giishkizhigwan group was charged with teaching and healing.
 Giigoonh or Namens (Fish)
 Wawaazisii or Owaazisii (Bullhead) (Oj, Od)
 Maanameg (Catfish) (Ms, Oj, Od)
 Adikameg (Whitefish) (Od)
 Namebin(aa) (Sucker) (Oj, Od, Po)
 Numaii or Maame (Sturgeon) (Oj, Po)
 Ginoozhe (Pike) (Ms, Oj, Od)
 Mikinaak (Snapping turtle) (Oj)
 Mishiikenh (Mud turtle) (Oj, Po)
 Miskwaadesi (Painted turtle) (Oj)
 Ginebig (Snake) (Ms, Oj)
 Omazaandamo (Black snake) (Od)
 Midewewe or Ozhiishiigwe (Rattle snake), or Zhiishiigwaan (Rattle) (Al, Od)
 Omakakii (Frog) (Po)
 Nigig (Otter) (Ms, Od)
 Nibiinaabe (Merman)
 Ashaageshiinh (Crab) (Po)

Nooke group
The Nooke group was responsible for defense and healing.  Though today the Bear Clan has all merged into a single clan known as Nooke, at one time the Bear was the largest — so large, in fact, that it was sub-divided into body parts such as the head (Makoshtigwaan or 'bear-skull'), the ribs and the feet (Nookezid or 'tender-foot'), as well as different types of bears such as the Waabishki-makwa or 'white black bear' and the Mishimakwa or 'grizzly bear'.
 Makwa (Bear) (Ms, Oj, Od, Po)
Makoshtigwaan (Bear-skull)(Oj)
Nookezid (Tender-foot)(Oj)
 Makokon (Bear's Liver) (Ms)
 Miskwaa'aa (Blood) (Ns)
 Waabishki-makwa (White black bear)(Oj)
 Mishimakwa (Grizzly bear)(Oj)
 Bizhiw (Lynx) (Oj, Od)
 Ma'iingan (Oj) or Mawii'aa (Po) (Wolf)

Baswenaazhi group
The Baswenaazhi group were traditionally charged with outgoing International communications.  Because of this, often members of the Baswenaazhi group are said to be the most vocal.
 Binesi (Thunderbird)
 Ajijaak(we) (Crane or "Thunder") (Ms, Oj, Od, Po)
 Nesawaakwaad ("Forked tree") (Od)
 Ashagi (Heron) (Ns)
 Gekek (Hawk) (Oj, Od)
 Omigizi(we) (Bald eagle) (Ms, Oj, Od, Po)
 Mitigomizh (White oak) (Ms)
 Wiigwaas (Birch bark) (Ms, Ns)
 Giniw (Golden eagle) (Po)
 Bibiigiwizens (Sparrowhawk)(Od)
 Makade-gekek(we) (Black hawk) (Po)

Bemaangik group
The Bemaangik are charged with internal/domestic communications.  They were often charged with the community's own council fires and help facilitate dialogue on all internal/domestic issues.
 Bineshiinh (Bird)
 Aan'aawenh, Aa'aawenh or Aa'aawe (Pintail) (Oj)
 Owewe (Wild goose or "Swan")
 Bine (Partridge or "turkey") or Aagask (grouse) (Oj, Po) 
 Nika (Goose) (Ms, Oj)
 Maang (Loon) (Al, Oj, Od, Po)
 (Makade)Zhiishiib ((Black) duck) (Oj)
 Gayaashk (Gull) (Oj, Od)
 Jiwiiskwiiskiwe (Snipe) (Oj)
 Omooshka'oozi (Bittern) (Oj)
 Zhedeg (Pelican)
 Ogiishkimanisii (Kingfisher) (Al, Oj)
 Aandeg (Crow) (Po)
 Gaagaagishiinh (Raven)
 Omiimii (Pigeon) (Ms)
 Apishi-gaagaagi (Magpie) (Ms)

Metaphors
On occasion, instead of referring to the totem by the actual being's name, a clan is identified instead by a metaphor describing the characteristic of the clan's totem.  The metaphors that survive to today include:
 Bimaawidaasi 'Carrier' = Amik(we) 'Beaver'
 Giishkizhigwan 'Cut-tail' = Maanameg 'Catfish'
 Nooke 'Tender' = Makwa 'Bear'
 Baswenaazhi 'Echo-maker' = Ajijaak(we) 'Crane'
 Bemaangik 'Pass-by Sounder' = Owewe 'Wild goose'

Social order
Some national sub-divisions were simply referred by their major clan component.  An example of this would be Maandawe-doodem ('Fisher-clan') of the Meshkwahkihaki peoples, who live along the south shore of Lake Superior.  More inland than the Maandawe-doodem were the Waagosh-doodem ('Fox clan') of the Meshkwahkihaki, who are called the Fox Tribe in English.  When the Maandawe were defeated in a major battle between the Ojibwe and the Meshkwahkihaki peoples, the surviving Maandawe were adopted as part of the Ojibwa nation, but instead as the Waabizheshi-doodem ('Marten clan'). Among some Ojibwe people, (though not all) the Waabizheshi clan is also used to denote a form of adoption, i.e., a non-native father and Ojibwe mother.  In other instances, for example,  communities such as the Amikwaa were treated as fully interdependent Nations of the Anishinaabeg Confederacy, or given a designation to represent their primary function in the social order, such as with the Manoominikeshiinyag ('Ricing-rails') or the Waawaashkeshi-ininiwag ('Deer[-clan] Men').

Some  indicate non-Ojibwe origins.  Other than Waabizheshi, these include the Ogiishkimanisii-doodem (Kingfisher Clan) and Ma'iingan-doodem (Wolf Clan) for Dakota and Migizi-doodem (Eagle Clan) for Americans.  There are other  considered rare today among the Ojibwa because the  have migrated into other tribes, such as the Nibiinaabe-doodem (Merman Clan), which shows up as the Water-spirits Clan of the Winnebagoes.

Kinship

Ojibwa understanding of kinship is complex, taking into account of not only the immediate family but also the extended family.  It is considered a modified Bifurcate merging (Iroquois) kinship system.  Consequently, Ojibwa would speak of not only about grandfather and grandmother, father and mother, and son and daughter, but also would speak of elder brother, younger sibling, cross-uncle, parallel-aunt, male sibling of same gender, female sibling of same gender and sibling of opposite gender, and cross-cousin of the opposite gender, to name only a few.

Siblings generally share the same term with parallel-cousins as with any Bifurcate merging kinship system due to being a member the same , but the modified system allows for younger sibling to share the same kinship term with younger cross-cousins.  In addition the complexity wanes as one goes away from the speaker's immediate generation, with some degree of complexity retained with female relatives (for example,  is 'my mother's sister' or 'my father's sister-in-law'—i.e., my parallel-aunt—but also 'my parent's female cross-cousin').  In both with the great-grandparents and older generations and with the great-grandchildren and younger generations, the Ojibwa collectively call them . This sign of kinship/clans speaks of the very nature of the Anishinaabe's entire philosophy/lifestyle, that is of interconnectedness and balance between all living generations and all generations of the past and of the future.

In addition to the Anishinaabeg , clans of other tribes are considered related to the Anishinaabe clans if they have the same designation.  Consequently, for example, a union between an Anishinaabe Bear Clan member with a Cherokee Bear Clan member would be considered illegal — even incestuous — by many traditional community groups.

Notable

White Crane

The White Crane clan were the traditional hereditary chiefs of the Ojibwe at Sault Ste. Marie and Madeline Island, and were some of the more powerful chiefs encountered by the first French explorers of Lake Superior.  Members of the crane clan include:
Tagwagane – an important chief at Madeline Island in the early 19th century
Ikwesewe – the wife of Michel Cadotte and the namesake of Madeline Island

Loon 

Closely associated with the crane clan, members of the loon clan became important chiefs on Lake Superior's south shore during the fur trade period.
Members of the loon clan include:
Chief Buffalo – a famous chief of Madeline Island
Walter Bresette – a Red Cliff Ojibwe activist

Bear 

Always the most numerous of the Anishinaabeg, members of the bear clan were traditionally the warriors and police (Ogichidaa), as well as the healers.  Many members of the clan continue in these roles today.  The bear clan provided most of those who participated in the Bad River Train Blockade.  In fiction, the police officers in the novels of Louise Erdrich come from the bear clan.

Eagle 

Now one of the most common clans, the eagle totem was once of the smaller clans.  However, the number of eagle totem members grew when new members whose paternal ancestors were Americans were assigned to this totem.  Since the first sustained contact by the Anishinaabe with the United States was through government officials, the symbol of the American eagle was taken for a clan marker. Members of the Eagle clan include:
William Whipple Warren – a 19th-century Ojibwe historian
Nahnebahwequa – Mississauga Ojibway missionary and spokeswoman
Kahkewaquonaby – Mississauga Ojibway Methodist missionary and spokesman
Anton Treuer – Leech Lake Band Ojibwe historian and language activist

External links 
 Nindoodemag: The Significance of Algonquian Kinship Networks in the Eastern Great Lakes Region, 1600–1701
 Aboriginal totem signatures, the Great Peace of Montreal, 1701
 DEEDS / NATIONS — Directory of First Nations Individuals in South-Western Ontario 1750 - 1850 by Greg Curnoe, showing some treaty-signatory doodem
 Introduction to Kinship Terms by Dr. J. Rand Valentine.

References 

 Benton-Banai, Edward. (1979) The Mishoomis Book.
 Hilger, M. Inez. (1951)  Chippewa Child Life and Its Cultural Background.
 Johnson, Basil. (1990)  Ojibway Heritage.
 Tanner, John. (1830) A narrative of the captivity and adventures of John Tanner, (U.S. interpreter at the Saut de Ste. Marie,) during thirty years residence among the Indians in the interior of North America, ed. Edwin James.
 Warren, William W. (1851) History of the Ojibway People.
 Mooney and Thomas. (1910) Handbook of American Indians North of Mexico.

Anishinaabe culture
Great Lakes tribal culture
Odawa
Ojibwe
Potawatomi
Clans
Native American history of Michigan
Native American history of Minnesota
Native American history of Wisconsin